Collen Mmotla (born 4 June 1990) is a South African DJ and music producer. Born and raised  Diphale, Burgersfort, Chyma started his musical career in early 2000's as a pianist prior becoming a DJ.

His third studio album Musique (2022), debuted number one in South Africa.

Education 
After completed his matric in 2007, he attended University of Technology studying Analytical Chemistry. 

He also attended Boston College studied media and graduated in 2013.

Career
Chymamusique started his music career in 2000 as a gospel and jazz pianist. He later developed an interest in house music in 2005 and started producing it in 2006. He released his first online single in 2010.

He founded and manages "Chymamusique Records" and is signed to the record labels House Afrika & Soul Candi. He was a Mofunk Records member from 2010 to 2013.

In DJing, Chymamusique has played internationally, and shared stages with DJs and producers including Vinny Da Vinci, Ralf Gum, Brazo Wa Afrika, Glen Lewis, QB Smith, Charles Webster and Atjazz.

In music producing, He has worked with Kaylow, DJ Fresh, Anané Vega, Monique Bingham, Brazo wa Afrika, Brian Temba, George Lesley and Ree Morris.

In early September 2021, he announced his third studio album via Instagram.

Musique was released on September 30, 2021. The album features Afrotraction, Da Vynalist, DJ Tears PLK, Brian Temba, Rona Ray, and Buddynice.

It peaked at number one on Local iTunes album charts.

Awards and nominations

South African Music Awards

Metro FM Music Awards

Discography

Studio Albums
 House Afrika : House Dimensions (2012) 
 After The Storm (2017) 
 Musique (2021)

SINGLES & EPs 
Quarantine EP - 2020
Bass & Synth - Single 2019
Last Night (feat. O So T) - Single 2019
Sax on Fleek - EP 2019
Its so Amazing (Remix) [feat. Happy] - Single 2019
Perfectly Lovers (feat. P Tempo) - Single 2018
Something About You (feat. Unqle Chriz) - Single 2018
Artist Series, Vol. 1 - EP 2018
Kubili - Single 2018
Follow (Chyma's Rendition) [feat. Kent Smoke & YVES] - Single 2017
Music Express Session 1 - EP 2016
Jazz vs. Soulful, Vol. 1 - EP 2014
Jazz According to House (Remixes Part 2) - Single 2013
World Is Good (Original Mix) [feat. Rona Ray] - Single 2012
Soul and Mind - Single 2012
Chymatology - Single 2012
Cant Get Enough - Single 2012
Jazz According to House - Single 2011
Lost in Words - Single 2011

References

External links
Chymamusique Website
Chymamusique Music Bio
Chymamusique on Traxsource

South African DJs
South African house musicians
South African record producers
People from Sekhukhune District Municipality
Living people
1990 births